Type 30 may refer to:
 Peugeot Type 30, motor vehicle by the French auto-maker Peugeot
 Type 30 bayonet, bayonet designed for the Imperial Japanese Army
 Type 30 rifle, standard infantry rifle of the Imperial Japanese Army